This is a list of events in the year 2019 in Malaysia.

Incumbents

Federal level 

 Yang di-Pertuan Agong:
 Sultan Muhammad V of Kelantan (until 6 January)
 Al-Sultan Abdullah of Pahang  (from 31 January)
 Raja Permaisuri Agong:
 Tunku Azizah of Pahang (from 31 January) 
 Deputy Yang di-Pertuan Agong:
 Sultan Nazrin Shah of Perak
 Prime Minister: Tun Dr Mahathir Mohamad
 Deputy Prime Minister: Dato' Seri Dr. Wan Azizah Wan Ismail
 Chief Justice: 
 Richard Malanjum (until 13 April)
 Tengku Maimun Tuan Mat (from 2 May)

State level 
  :
Sultan of Johor: Sultan Ibrahim Ismail
 Menteri Besar of Johor: 
Osman Sapian (until 8 April 2019)
Sahruddin Jamal (from 14 April 2019)
  :
 Sultan of Kedah: Sultan Sallehuddin
 Menteri Besar of Kedah: Mukhriz Mahathir
  :
 Sultan of Kelantan: Sultan Muhammad V 
 Menteri Besar of Kelantan: Ahmad Yaakob
  :
 Raja of Perlis: Tuanku Syed Sirajuddin
 Menteri Besar of Perlis: Azlan Man
  :
 Sultan of Perak: Sultan Nazrin Shah
 Menteri Besar of Perak: Ahmad Faizal Azumu
  :
 Sultan of Pahang:
 Sultan Ahmad Shah (until 14 January)
 Sultan Abdullah Al Haj (from 15 January)
 Menteri Besar of Pahang: Wan Rosdy Wan Ismail
  :
 Sultan of Selangor: Sultan Sharafuddin Idris Shah
 Menteri Besar of Selangor: Amirudin Shari
  :
 Sultan of Terengganu: Sultan Mizan Zainal Abidin
 Menteri Besar of Terengganu: Ahmad Samsuri Mokhtar
  :
 Yang di-Pertuan Besar of Negeri Sembilan: Tuanku Muhriz
 Menteri Besar of Negeri Sembilan: Aminuddin Harun
  :
 Yang di-Pertua Negeri of Penang: Abdul Rahman Abbas
 Chief Minister of Penang: Chow Kon Yeow
  :
 Yang di-Pertua Negeri of Malacca: Mohd Khalil Yaakob
 Chief Minister of Malacca: Adly Zahari
  :
 Yang di-Pertua Negeri of Sarawak: Abdul Taib Mahmud
 Chief Minister of Sarawak: Abang Johari Openg
  :
 Yang di-Pertua Negeri of Sabah: Juhar Mahiruddin
 Chief Minister of Sabah: Shafie Apdal

Events

January
 1 January - Smoking ban was planned to take effect, however the grace period was extended twice throughout the year and the ban will only be implemented the following year.
 6 January - Sultan Muhammad V stepped down as the 15th Yang di-Pertuan Agong.
 15 January - The Tengku Mahkota of Pahang, Tengku Abdullah Ibni Sultan Ahmad Shah was proclaimed as the new Sultan of Pahang with the title Al-Sultan Abdullah Ri'ayatuddin Al-Mustafa Billah Shah.
 21 January - Thaipusam
 24 January - The special Conference of Rulers is held in Istana Negara, Kuala Lumpur to elect the new 16th Yang di-Pertuan Agong. Al-Sultan Abdullah Ri'ayatuddin Al-Mustafa Billah Shah of Pahang is elected as the 16th Yang di-Pertuan Agong while Sultan Nazrin Muizzuddin Shah of Perak is elected as a Deputy Yang di-Pertuan Agong.
 26 January - 2019 Cameron Highlands by-election. It was won by Ramli Mohd Nor, a direct candidate representing Barisan Nasional. Upon his win, he joined the coalition's component party, United Malays National Organisation (UMNO).
 28 January - Former prime minister Najib Razak was charged in the Kuala Lumpur High Court on three additional charges involving money laundering totalling RM47 million five years ago.
 29 January - Tunku Azizah Aminah Maimunah proclaimed as Tengku Ampuan of Pahang, a title reserved for the consort of the current ruler or sultan, of noble birth, as enshrined in the Pahang State Constitution. Her second son, Tengku Hassanal Ibrahim proclaimed as Tengku Mahkota (Crown prince) of Pahang.
 31 January - The new 16th Yang di-Pertuan Agong, Al-Sultan Abdullah Ri'ayatuddin Al-Mustafa Billah Shah of Pahang sworn-in, beginning his five-year term as Head of State.

February
 5–6 February - Chinese New Year
 18 February - The Billion Dollar Whale, which chronicles the 1MDB scandal, is billionaire Bill Gates' book of choice.

March
 2 March - 2019 Semenyih by-election. It was won by Zakaria Hanafi, Barisan Nasional's candidate from component party United Malays National Organisation (UMNO). The result meant that the political coalition got its seat back from the Pakatan Harapan coalition whose original member of parliament, Bakhtiar Mohd Nor died on 11 January 2019 at the age of 57 due to heart attack.
 14 March - Opening of the IKEA Malaysia's fourth store in Batu Kawan, Penang.
 28 March - The High Court set April 3 at 2pm for the trial of former prime minister Najib Razak’s SRC case.

April
1 April - Former prime minister Najib Razak filed another bid (a judicial review application) against the Federal Court’s refusal to grant him an order to stay the trial of his SRC case.
9 April - Menteri Besar of Johor Osman Sapian resigns.
10 April - A White Paper on FELDA is tabled in Parliament. It revealed losses and questionable deals, with cash assistance from the Government to help settlers.
13 April - Rantau by-election. It was won by incumbent United Malays National Organisation (UMNO) state assemblyman, Mohamad Hasan representing Barisan Nasional after his original result was declared null and void, allowed him to retain his seat.
17 April - Prime Minister Mahathir Mohamad has been listed as one of Time Magazine’s 100 most influential people.
18 April - Prime Minister Mahathir Mohamad says Malaysia should be able to leverage on 5G technology within the next three years and catapult the national economy towards strong and sustainable growth.
19 April - Tengku Mahkota of Kelantan, Tengku Muhammad Faiz Petra marries Swedish citizen, Sofie Louise Johansson.
24 April - Water supply system improvement works at Sungai Selangor Phase 2 (SSP2) Water Treatment Plant.

May
 5 May - Fortune magazine has ranked Prime Minister Mahathir Mohamad the world’s 47th greatest leader.
 10 May - State awards conferred upon former prime minister Najib Razak and his wife Rosmah Mansor by Selangor Ruler Sultan Sharafuddin Idris Shah have been suspended. Selangor state secretary Mohd Amin Ahmad Ahya said in a statement that the suspension follows the graft, criminal breach of trust and money laundering charges brought against both Najib and Rosmah.
 11 May - Sandakan by-election. It was won by Vivian Wong Shir Yee representing Democratic Action Party (DAP) of the Sabah Heritage Party, Pakatan Harapan and United Progressive People of Kinabalu Organisation alliance, replacing her father and original Member of Parliament Wong Tien Fatt who died of heart attack.
 14 May - The Court of Appeal dismissed former deputy prime minister Ahmad Zahid Hamidi’s appeal to have his impounded passport returned to perform umrah.

June
 5 June & 6 June - Hari Raya Aidilfitri
13 June - Lee Chong Wei announces retirement.
17 June - Prime Minister Mahathir Mohamad in London said Malaysia seeks investments in the high-technology sector in line with the country’s goals of providing high income for its people.

July
 1 July - The police will conduct investigations into two dubious transactions found in the FELDA White Paper, with follow-up actions planned for the other six transactions.
 25 July - Prime Minister Mahathir Mohamad has been conferred an honorary doctorate by the Ankara Yildirim Beyazit University (AYBU) at the Council of Higher Education.
 29 July - A lawyer told the High Court that former prime minister Najib Razak, in a defamation suit against former MCA president Ling Liong Sik admitted that RM42mil from SRC International Sdn Bhd went into his personal bank accounts.
 30 July - The installation of 16th Yang di-Pertuan Agong Al-Sultan Abdullah Ri'ayatuddin Al-Mustafa Billah Shah, Sultan of Pahang at Istana Negara, Jalan Duta, Kuala Lumpur.

August
 
 1 August – Kuala Terengganu Drawbridge is open to traffic
 7 August – Prime Minister Mahathir Mohamad was conferred an honorary doctorate by the International University of Japan (IUJ) in recognition of his outstanding contributions to Malaysia and Japan relationships.
 9 August – Visiting Indonesian President Joko Widodo arrived at the Perdana Putra building in Putrajaya for a four-eyed meeting with Prime Minister Mahathir Mohamad.
 13 August – British-Irish Nora Anne Quoirin was missing 9 days ago and found dead later at a resort in Negeri Sembilan.
 18 August – Yang di-Pertuan Agong, Al-Sultan Abdullah made its 3-day official state visit to Brunei and meets the Sultan Hassanal Bolkiah.
 26 August – Yang di-Pertuan Agong, Al-Sultan Abdullah made its 4-day official state visit to Indonesia and meets the President, Joko Widodo.
 31 August – 62nd Independence and National Day of Malaysia (Merdeka Day), marking the 62nd anniversary of Malaysia's independence from the British at the Dataran Merdeka in the country's capital city, Kuala Lumpur on 31 August 1957, Saturday and the very great independence was declared by the country's very 1st Prime Minister, Tunku Abdul Rahman and the then-Deputy Prime Minister Abdul Razak Hussein and then-Yang di-Pertuan Agong (King) Abdul Rahman of Negeri Sembilan.

September
 6 September - Prime Minister Mahathir Mohamad was conferred an honorary degree by Japan’s Doshisha University. He was conferred the Honorary Doctorate of Humane Letters for his devotion to education and the rule of law.
 20 September - Luqman Hakim Shamsudin became the first and youngest Malaysian football player to formally sign for Belgian club K.V. Kortrijk with a 5-year contract.

October
 5 October - Shared Prosperity Vision 2030 which aimed at increase the incomes of all ethnic groups, particularly the Bumiputera comprising the B40 (lower income group), the hardcore poor, the economically poor, those in economic transition, Orang Asli, Sabah and Sarawak bumiputeras, the disabled, youths, women, children and senior citizens was launched by Mahathir Mohamad.
 6 October - Mugen Rao wins the Bigg Boss Tamil 3 reality TV show.
 27 October - Diwali/Deepavali
 31 October - Malaysia completely switched its television broadcast format from analogue to digital with the last of the analogue switch over (ASO) took place in East Malaysia after 3 phases on 21 July in Langkawi, 19 August in Central and South Peninsular and 14 October in North and East Peninsular.

November
11 November – Former prime minister Najib Razak was ordered by the High Court to enter his defence on all seven charges of abusing his position for gratification, criminal breach of trust and money laundering involving RM42 million of SRC International Sdn Bhd’s funds. Judge Mohd Nazlan Mohd Ghazali said the prosecution had successfully adduced credible evidence proving each and every essential ingredient of the offences.
16 November – 2019 Tanjung Piai by-election. It was won by Wee Jeck Seng, candidate of Barisan Nasional from the coalition's component party Malaysian Chinese Association (MCA) who originally held the parliament seat since 2008. But his rule of the constituency was temporarily stopped when he lost to Mohamed Farid Md Rafik, a Malaysian United Indigenous Party (BERSATU) candidate representing Pakatan Harapan during the 2018 Malaysian general election, whose death during his time as member of parliament due to heart attack triggered the by-election. Wee's win meant that he got his seat back from the Pakatan Harapan coalition.

December
 30 November – 11 December - Malaysia participated at the 2019 Southeast Asian Games with 773 athletes in 52 sports. It ranked 5th among the participating nations with 55 gold medals, 58 silver medals and 71 bronze medals. Its achievement was 15 golds short of its intended 70-gold target. The contingent was affected by the Rhythmic Gymnastics gold-medal issue during the event.
 3 December – Former prime minister Najib Razak takes the witness stand at the High Court as the first defence witness to answer charges against him.
16 December – Convicted killer Azilah Hadri has made an explosive allegation from death row in Kajang Prison - the order to kill Altantuya Shaariibuu came from former Prime Minister Najib Razak and the latter's close associate, Abdul Razak Baginda.
 18 – 21 December - Kuala Lumpur Summit was held at the Kuala Lumpur Convention Centre. It was attended mainly by the world's Muslim countries leaders and delegates.
20 December – Former prime minister Najib Razak uttered the sumpah laknat (swearing in the face of divine retribution) to deny former police commando Azilah Hadri's statutory declaration (SD) that he gave him the order to kill Altantuya Shaariibuu.

National Day and Malaysia Day

National Day theme 
Sayangi Malaysiaku, Malaysia Bersih (Love My Malaysia, A Clean Malaysia)

National Day parade 
Putrajaya

Malaysia Day celebration 
Kuching, Sarawak

Sports
 15–20 January – 2019 Malaysian Badminton Masters
 2–7 April – 2019 Malaysian Badminton Open
 6–13 April – 2019 Tour de Langkawi
 11–18 April – 2020 Sultan Azlan Shah Cup
 12–19 October – 2019 Sultan of Johor Cup
 24 November – 2019 Penang Bridge International Marathon

Deaths
 17 March – Tunku Puan Zanariah - Eighth Raja Permaisuri Agong of Malaysia
 22 May – Sultan Haji Ahmad Shah - the fifth and former modern Sultan of Pahang, the seventh Yang di-Pertuan Agong of Malaysia from 26 April 1979 to 25 April 1984 (born 1930)
 28 May – Khoo Kay Kim - Professor Emeritus and renowned historian.
 17 August – Suffian Rahman - Terengganu FC's goalkeeper
 11 September – Shafie Salleh - Chief Scout of Malaysia
 28 September – Sultan Ismail Petra - the 28th and former Sultan of Kelantan

See also
 2019
 2018 in Malaysia
 History of Malaysia

References

 
2010s in Malaysia
Years in Malaysia